Coleophora bedella is a moth of the family Coleophoridae that can be found in Iran and Tajikistan.

The larvae feed on Salix australis and Populus nigra. They feed on the leaves of their host plant.

References

External links

bedella
Moths of Asia
Endemic fauna of Tajikistan
Moths described in 1976